Borrett is a surname. Notable people with the surname include:

Charles Borrett (1916–2000), British Anglican Archdeacon
Christopher Borrett (born 1979), British cricketer
George Borrett (1868–1952), Royal Navy officer
Norman Borrett (1917–2004), British sportsman
Oswald Borrett (1878–1950), British Army officer 
Paul Borrett (born 1944), British cricketer
Sheila Borrett (1905–1986), British pioneer broadcaster